In classical guitar, the right hand is developed in such a way that it can sustain two, three, and four voice harmonies while also paying special attention to tone production. The index (i), middle (m), and ring (a) fingers are generally used to play the melody, while the thumb (p) accompanies in the bass register adding harmony and produces a comparable texture and effect to that of the piano. The classical guitar is a solo polyphonic instrument, and it is difficult to master.

Classical guitar techniques can be organized broadly into subsections for the right hand, the left hand, and miscellaneous techniques. In guitar, performance elements such as musical dynamics (loudness or softness) and tonal/timbral variation are mostly determined by the hand that physically produces the sound. In other words, the hand that plucks the strings defines the musical expression. Historically, this role has been assigned to the dominant hand which, for the majority of players, is the right hand. Similar reasoning is behind string players using the right hand for controlling the bow. In the following article the role of the hands should be reversed when considering left-handed players.

An introductory overview of classical guitar technique is given in the article Classical guitar (Section: Performance).

Posture

The "classical" guitar is the traditional guitar of Spain. It is built so that the right-hand side falls at the back of the sound hole when it is placed on the left leg. Basic considerations in determining a chosen playing position include:

the physical stability of the instrument
ensuring the freedom of both hands such that they have free access to the instrument and can meet all technical demands without having to be occupied with supporting the instrument or keeping the instrument upright
elimination of general muscular tension and physical stress by assuming a comfortable and balanced body position.

A number of different approaches have been taken.

Foot stool

This is the traditional position and still the most common. The player sits on the front of the chair and the left foot is supported by a foot stool or some other device. The right elbow is placed on the box of the guitar so that the hand falls over the strings, with the fingers at an angle to the strings. The right foot tucks underneath the player to make room for the guitar.  And the guitar is turned to the player's right so as to rest against the ribs on the player's right side.

Care must be taken to keep the guitar turned to the right. There is a tendency for the guitar to slide down the left leg, collapsing the left shoulder and distorting the right wrist (called "deviated wrist"). Properly held, the fingers play at an angle to the string, not perpendicular. Keeping the guitar turned out to the right is important because, when the guitar slides down the left leg and the left shoulder collapses, the thumb and fingers of the right hand hit each other. In order to play freely, the fingers and thumb must be able to follow-through without hitting each other. When the guitar remains turned to the right, the fingers are at an angle to the strings and the thumb plays without interfering with the fingers.

The sample photo appears to show the guitarist's back both leaning and rotated to his left, with the left shoulder significantly lower than the right. This is not ideal as it is not balanced and symmetrical, but somewhat contorted. A good position can be achieved with the footstool (see, for example the very detailed instructions of Offermann but contortions are very common with footstools as can be seen in photos of Segovia and Tarrega

Guitar supports on leg(s)
A number of guitar supports have been designed to allow the guitarist to sit in a posture recommended by the Alexander Technique: with a straight, untwisted spine, even shoulders, horizontal upper legs and both feet flat on the floor. The idea is to use the support to place the guitar in the correct position above the legs rather than conform the body to the guitar. Virginia Azagra Rueda provides an extensive discussion of how to sit correctly and how to use rests to help achieve such a position.

Tripods

The tripod used by Dionisio Aguado y Garcia is shown here; Note how straight Aguado's back is in this lithograph and how his shoulders are level.

Straps 
Straps are used for acoustic and electric guitars, and some argue for their use in classical guitars (particularly early guitars).

Endpins
Paul Galbraith uses a cello-like endpin arrangement.

Playing techniques
Over the history of the guitar, there have been many schools of technique, often associated with the current popular virtuoso of the time. For example, Mauro Giuliani (1781-1829) is associated with arpeggio playing and his compositions are largely based on their use. Giuliani's solution to achieving independence between the fingers (evening out constraints or differences between the fingers) in the right hand was playing his 120 Right Hand Studies. By contrast, Andres Segovia maintained that playing scales two hours a day "will correct faulty hand position" (1953) and for many years, this was the accepted practice. In both schools—one being all free-stroke (Giuliani arpeggio practice) and the other rest-stroke (Segovia scale practice) -- the basis for learning the technique is hours of repetition.

In 1983, Richard Provost outlined principles of scale and arpeggio technique based on his study of anatomy to make the 'inherent kinesthetic tendencies' ("our limitations") of the human body work for the player. Rather than working around them, the intention being production of "a musical, articulated sound within our physical limitations". The basis of this technique is referred to by Charles Duncan as "the awareness of the release of tension".

Fingering notation

The traditional names of the right-hand fingers are pulgar, índice, medio, and anular, derived from Spanish. They are generally called p, i, m, and a, "p" being the thumb and "a" being the ring finger. (c = little finger or "chiquito").

The four fingers of the left hand (which stop the strings) are designated 1 = index, 2 = middle, 3 = ring finger, 4 = little finger The number 0 designates an open string, one not stopped by a finger of the left hand. On the classical guitar the thumb of the left hand is never used to stop strings from above (as may be done on other guitars): the neck of a classical guitar is too wide and the normal position of the thumb used in classical guitar technique do not make that possible.

Scores (in contrast with tablature) do not systematically indicate which string is to be plucked (although in most cases the choice is obvious). When indication of the string is required, the strings are designated 1 to 6 (1 for the high E, to 6 the low E) with the string number inside a circle.

The fret/position where the first finger of the left hand is placed on the fingerboard is usually not systematically indicated, but when necessary (mostly in the case of the execution of barrés) indicated with Roman numerals corresponding to the fret number from the string nut (which has no numeral) towards the bridge.

Right hand technique
Placing the right hand on the strings

If you look at your fingers, you will notice that the index finger is shorter than the middle finger. If you place a pencil across the fingertips, you will see a diagonal line. This line is "the angle of the fingers to the string". As noted above in the section about holding the guitar, the fingers fall at an angle to the strings and this line, across the tips of the index and middle fingers is the angle at which they touch the strings (a finger stays behind).

To find the hand position on the strings, drape the wrist, swing the arm to the strings and touch the i finger to the strings. Then roll the arm on the guitar until the m finger touches the strings (just those two fingers, i & m, not the ring finger, that comes later), and this is "the angle of the fingers to the string". In this way, the shape of the i & m fingers is the same, they do not reach or hook. The fingers are on the diagonal, not square to the string, the thumb is out front.

The height of the wrist off the guitar is roughly equal to the width of the back hand.

The finger on the string

Release the fingers and swing the i finger to the string. The finger swings on a hinge (the first knuckle) and goes to the string. The finger lands directly on the nail and flesh at the same time. By landing on the nail, a "ticking" sound is avoided. Further, the nail lands on the side of the nail, not flat on the nail, but at an angle to the string. The nail then crosses the string in exactly one point on the string and on the nail, avoiding the sound of "wiping" the string with the nail. Once the finger is on the string, landing on the nail, the finger pushes (not pulls), the tip joint releases, and a clean 'snap' occurs, without ticking or wiping sounds.

The two primary plucking techniques are:

 Rest-stroke (apoyando), in which the finger that plucks the string lands on the next string; and
 Free-stroke (tirando), in which the finger does not land on the string behind, but, rather, continues until the energy of the stroke is dissipated.

Rest stroke is useful for single-line melody playing. Free-stroke is mainly used in arpeggio ("broken-chord") playing. They are often combined to provide contrasting voices, between melody and harmony. "Rest-stroke on the melody" is a common approach to balancing the voices.

An important factor for the quality of sound is the angle of the finger as the string is plucked. This is usually not at a right angle to strings, but usually where the outstretched fingers would point slightly to the left. This is considered both beneficial to tone and creating less noise due to nail contact, since the string can glide over the rounded nail, rather than being hooked or caught by it.

Holding the fingers and hand perpendicular to the strings may cause other difficulties. Since the string is aligned with the groove between fingertip and nail: this may cause clicking noises or double sounds (fingertip sound, then nail sound). By holding the fingers and hand to the left, it is impossible for the string to land in the groove, since the left side of the nail will touch the string first.

One of the tenets of right-hand technique in melody playing is strict alternation of i & m. That is, no right-hand finger should be used twice in a row (excluding the thumb). The a finger is occasionally used if i-m alternation creates an awkward string-crossing in the right hand. Otherwise, the default is strict alternation of i & m. Where the a finger is used, i-a or a-m fingering is preferred to m-a, due to the physical constraints of the hand.

Scale playing: Usually an alteration of the index and middle finger; however other alterations using the annular finger (or even an alterations with the thumb) are common as wellFactors that influence the choice might be the speed of the scale and the progression of the melody over more than one string, i.e., a scale usually starts on one string and continues on another.However, during slower movements (especially of contrapuntal music) guitarists might not alternate the fingers strictly if this facilitates the interpretation by preserving tonal similarity. An example of this might be when the index finger (or the thumb) is used to play one melody line on the 3rd string while the annular finger might be used for a melody on the first string. A melody line can move over various strings, so a flexible approach is needed, experimentation and development of patterns that suit individual preference.

It is important to note that not only the fingers are involved in the plucking of the string, but the hand should also be held comfortably loose and may move slightly as well - even the arm is involved. For example, when playing scales (usually with alternating fingers, e.g., index, middle, index, middle, ...) and moving from the top strings down, or the bottom strings up, the hand moves up and down as well in order to adjust the placement of the fingers to be at an optimum.

Tirando versus Apoyando
Tirando (also known as free-stroke) is where the plucking motion is made in such a manner that, after plucking, the finger stays in the air - it does therefore not land on an adjacent string. Apoyando (also known as the rest-stroke) is a plucking motion made in such a manner that after the desired string has been plucked, the fingertip rests on the next adjacent string.

Historically (for baroque guitars, right up to classical or romantic repertoire of Sor and Mertz) the free-stroke was used. One of the first classical guitarists to use the rest-stroke was the Spaniard Julian Arcas (1832–1882) (and it may have been used by Jose Ciebra as well), though it was already in use for flamenco music.

The rest-stroke was regarded as a fundamental way of plucking the string during much of the 20th century. Today certain professional classical guitarists prefer the free stroke.

Roberto Aussel (Professor of Classical guitar at the Hochschule für Musik und Tanz Köln) has said:
"Particularly, apoyando as a main principle, is today hardly used anymore."
"Speziell Apoyando als Grundprinzip findet sich heute kaum noch."
Aussel also notes that this preference of using primarily a free-stroke, was already common in Argentina in the 1950s, and in other South American countries. His teacher, Jorge Martínez Zárate, abandoned the rest-stroke completely and used only free-stroke, achieving an exceptional tone with it. Abel Carlevaro was also a strong proponent of the free-stroke. Carlevaro and Zárate advocated an "effective use of musclegroups and with it an equilibrium of energy and relaxation".

Manuel Barrueco has said that he used almost exclusively free-stroke in baroque music:
"[...] In baroque music I use probably at least 95% to 99% free strokes, as I feel it is more stylistically correct and it is the best way to fully control dynamics and tone in polyphonic music."

The choice of stroke that a guitarist will use is motivated by personal choice of tone quality, dynamic control and efficiency. The tendency of modern influential classical guitar performers and teachers to promote it often leads to a preference for free-stroke, and thus a discrepancy from earlier trends such as the mid-20th century reliance on rest-stroke.

Furthermore, by experimenting with hand positions and nail angles, it is possible to achieve satisfactory volume with the free-stroke which is comparable to that of the rest-stroke: this often requires the use of a smoothly filed fingernail.
Again, this is a matter of preference and taste for the individual guitarist.

Preparation
"Preparation" is the placing of the finger on the string such that the flesh — as well as part of the nail — touches the string, before a plucking motion is made, producing an articulated sound, found in other instruments.

Before plucking, usually both the left side of the nail and the finger touch the string; this enables the finger (and hand) to rest on the string in a balanced way. When the plucking motion is made, only the nail-contact remains: The curvature of the nail (starting from its left side) allows the string to be pulled back while the string slides towards the tip of the nail, where it is released in a single motion, called "the gesture". If the nail allowed to "wipe" the string rather than crossing in one spot, a grating noise or a very unarticulated sound of the nail traveling along the string is produced, which has a very distasteful sound and should be avoided (unless, of course, this tone or effect is desired).

For practice purposes, the use of preparation can be used to accentuate a staccato note: Here the finger is placed on the vibrating string to stop its sound, and only after a delay this finger plucks the string. Finger alterations that are commonly used are: i, m, i, m; "p, m, p, m" and "i, a, i, a" for faster progressions.  The last two are used because they eliminate the friction of the two neighboring fingers' passing in fast progressions (as i and m tend to rub together in unpracticed musicians).

Tremolo
Tremolo is the rapid reiteration of a string: plucking of the same string, although not necessarily on the same note many times, quickly and next to each other (although usually separated by a melody in the thumb).  In this instance, while there will still be "preparation," per se, it will not be evident and will definitely be lacking if the speed has not been gradually increased.

Finger alterations that are commonly used are:
"p, m, i" for slower, three note tremolos, with the thumb picking out the melody
"p, a, i" for faster three note tremolos, with the melody in the thumb
"p, a, m, i" for a four note tremolo, with the melody in the thumb
"p, i, a, m, i" or "p, m, a, m, i" for a five note tremolo, although almost exclusively used in flamenco. "p, c, a, m, i" is rarely used, if ever, as the pinky is not a very popular finger to be used.

Arpeggiation
Arpeggiation is similar to the tremolo technique, except almost always the fingers pluck separate strings.  Usually, the pattern of finger pluckings is such that it begins with the fingers resting on the strings as follows - thumb (p) on a bass-string and index (i), middle (m), third finger (a) each on one of the three treble strings respectively.

Finger alterations that are commonly used are:
"p, a, m, i"
"p, i, m, a"
"p, a, m, i, m, a"
"p, i, m, a, m, i"

The last two patterns are interesting, however, as if they are to be played quickly, the last m and an or i must be played with slightly less preparation, as it would be extraordinarily difficult to move the fingers to their correct strings for the second note and still have time for a normal preparation.

Note:
It is important to realize that as the right-hand progressions become faster, rest strokes become very impractical, and can wreak havoc upon one's technique.  Free strokes are always best for the index, middle, and third fingers, when playing fast arpeggios or sections of tremolo.

Analysis
A guitarist will individually choose how much preparation to use for each stroke, depending on personal choice and the effect that is to be produced. Most guitarists make this choice intuitively and will vary and adjust strokes while playing.

Varying viewpoints
Note:
The following discussion presents points that may differ from guitarist to guitarist. In any case the angle of the right hand's fingers (when outstretched) to the strings is not varied greatly.

Angle of attack

Slow: More parallel angle (right-hand fingers more to the left)The hand is usually held at such an angle, that the outstretched fingers point slightly to the left (rather than perpendicular) to the strings. But this angle can be actively varied (albeit only slightly) and results in different tones, but also has some consequences:The more the fingers point to the left of the strings (the more parallel they are to the strings), the longer the fingernail is in contact with the strings, since the string glides over more of the fingernail: This angle requires preparation - placing the nail (and finger) on the string, and then following through in a controlled manner. This angle creates a warmer tone, but because the string glides over more of the nail, this is not good for fast repetitive plucking.
Fast: More perpendicular angle (right-hand fingers)For fast repetitive picado, the vibrating string is immediately plucked again with the nail: an impulse is shot into the string so that it maintains its motion - there is no time for "preparation".At high speeds it is not easily possible to produce a strong clear tone, if the fingers are angled too far to the left, since there is no time for "preparation": "preparation" is the placing of the left side of the nail (and often also finger) on the string.The faster the plucking, the more a gliding over the nail (more parallel) delays the sound. Thus for fast plucking the guitarist may choose to hold the right-hand fingers at a more perpendicular angle to the strings (though the fingers might still point slightly to the left) and strike them more with the tip of the nail.

The above discussion was mainly focused on the angle as a dependency on the speed of plucking. Even more important is the dependency of the angle on the tone. As usual there is always some sort of trade-off involved and the ultimate details depend on each individual guitarist separately, as well as the players' fingers/nails.

Consequences on practicing speed build-upWhen practicing at slow speeds, the hand position and stroke used should ideally be the same as the one for the fast tempo.Usually the hand might be in different positions for fast and slow playing. More importantly a different stroke may be intuitively used for slower playing (i.e. stroke with preparation) than for faster playing (stroke without preparation). This means that when building up accuracy and evenness by practicing pluckings (such as tremolo) at slow speeds, the hand position and stroke used during this slow practice should be identical to the hand position and stroke that will be used when the pluckings are performed up to speed. This means that slow tremolo practice (for example) requires the practicing of "stroke without preparation"! This may be difficult since most guitarists intuitively choose a stroke with (at least) a bit of preparation during slower playing. However, in this respect, the practice-method of playing with short speed bursts in-between slow practice, can prove useful, by reminding the guitarist of the correct hand position and stroke (without preparation).
On the other hand, tremolo (etc.) should not be exclusively practiced with "speed-stroke", but also at slower speeds with a normal "stroke with preparation": to assist the guitarist in improving an intrinsic feeling for the location of the strings.

Right hand wrist/hand position
There is a lot of freedom in the positioning of the right hand, which affects the angle at which the fingers will attack the string. Guitarists spend a lot of time finding their own individual positions (as there can be more than one) that allow the fingers/nails to pluck the strings with
a quality of tone (possibly variations of tone with different positions)
a minimum of tension in fingers, wrist, or forearm
a healthy position (without strain)

Hand position is also influenced by the arm:
changing where the right arm rests on the guitar (either more to the left or more to the right):
This can be very helpful when changing timbre from near the bridge to closer to the fretboard
changing what part of the right arm rests on the guitar (either)

The hand can be varied in the following ways:
the height (bending) of the wrist, although (note that the more the wrist is bent, the more strain is placed upon it.  This can informally lead to wrist injuries)
bending of hand to the left or right from the wrist (this is usually considered a strain, and today many guitarists hold the hand almost straight compared to the arm)
the rotation of the hand (it can be rolled to the left or to the right. Often guitarist might occasionally roll the hand slightly to the right - opening up the hand and changing the angle of plucking; whilst others might generally use an open position with the hand rolled slightly to the left)

Nails
Modern practice generally makes use of the nails of the right hand in combination with the flesh of the fingertips in order to pluck the strings. During the 19th century many influential guitarists such as Fernando Sor, Francisco Tárrega and his pupil Emilio Pujol played using the flesh of the fingertip, in common with lute technique. This was more easily done with gut strings due to the surface texture, but became more difficult with the introduction of nylon strings where the surface was smooth. 

Plucking the strings usually involves making contact first with the fleshy part of the fingertip, the tip of the nail and then letting the string glide smoothly along the curvature of the fingernail until the string is released at the fingernail's tip. Generally, the tip of the nail should be shaped so that it doesn't 'hook' on the string but provides a reinforcing tone and clarity of articulation to the flesh.

As the majority of modern players follow the practices of angling the stroke of the finger - it may be considered that the left tip of the nail (viewed from above palm down) can be shaped and tapered to facilitate the release of the string after plucking. This involves filing the nail so that it presents a profile where the curve of the tip almost joins the finger smoothly on the left, and increases away from the finger to the right. For those players following the technique of using the right side of the finger (an approach popularized by the guitarists Ida Presti and Alexander Lagoya) - the opposite would apply.

The actual shape is subject to such individual biology and musical preference that only experience and guidance of other musicians will be seen to be the best form chosen by the student.

Strumming

 Rasgueado  See main article Rasgueado. Rasgueado or rasgueo is a Spanish term for different forms of strumming the strings on the flamenco and classical guitar that include the use of the back of the fingernails.  More commonly, the term refers to using the backs of the nail in sequence to give the impression of a very rapid strum. There are several types of rasgueado that employ differing combinations of fingers and thumb allowing for a variety of rhythmical accentuations and subdivisions of the beat.
 Use the palm-side of the thumb joint to lightly strum strings, producing a soft, low sound.
 Use the thumb nail to produce a bright sound.
 Use the thumb nail to strum from lowest string to highest, followed by a stroke by the thumb nail from highest string to lowest, and finally by the middle finger coming from highest string to lowest.  This pattern is most commonly used in the form of triplets for a 4/4 measure, or used four times in a 12/8 measure.
 A simple combination of both fingers and thumb, the thumb striking the lowest strings and fingers picking the upper notes of the chord from lowest to highest strings in rapid succession.

Left hand technique

While the right hand is responsible for the sound of the guitar, the left hand performs two functions: pressing on the strings (to shorten their effective length and change the pitch) and articulation, i.e. slurring (commonly known as 'hammer-ons' and 'pull-offs') and vibrato. In musical notation, the left-hand fingers are referred to as 1, 2, 3, and 4 (starting with index).

The basic position for the left hand is much the same as that of the right, except upside down. Unlike many players of steel-string and electric guitars, which have a narrower neck and fingerboard, classical guitarists do not place their left-hand thumbs over the top of the neck. Instead, they place them behind the neck, usually behind the second finger.

The thumb then rolls back so that the thumb plays 'off the bone'. The bone of the thumb 'hangs' off a shoulder that is carved into the back of the neck of the guitar and, eventually, a hard, dry callus forms on the thumb, allowing the left hand to shift without sticking to the guitar.

By keeping the thumb behind the second finger and playing off the front of the third finger, the classical guitarist sets the left-hand shape.

Playing with the left hand more or less parallel to the neck requires a certain amount of stretching between the fingers. There is a tendency, especially when one first begins guitar, to collapse the first and second fingers together to press on the string. For example, in playing the F on the first string, first fret (often the second note ever fingered after open E, first-string) there is a tendency to put the second finger on top of the first to hold the note. Holding a note with two fingers, 1 & 2, however, puts the reach between the fingers between the second and third, the hardest reach. The easiest reach is actually between the third and fourth (pinky) fingers. The next easiest between the first and second and the hardest between the middle fingers, between 2 & 3. Therefore, in order to put all the fingers on the strings (one finger per fret), the reach would best go between 1 & 2 and 3 & 4. Care should be taken to unlock 1 & 2. One way to train the hand to unlock 1 & 2 is to place a pencil between 1 & 2 with the other end behind the thumb while playing.

Classical guitarists have a different set of left-hand calluses on their fingertips than the steel-string players. In the steel-string, played with the guitar under the arm and on the right hip (called 'playing off the hip'), the left-hand fingers of the steel string guitarist play on the diagonal, or 'for the reach', and the fingertip lands on the pad of the finger, forming a callus on the pad. The classical guitarist has a different set of left-hand calluses as the hand of the classical player falls more parallel to the neck and plays on the "front" (nail side) of the fingertip. As a general rule, in classical, if the player concentrates on playing on the front of the third (or ring) finger, the other fingers will follow.

To play a note clearly, the fingertips of the left hand should be pressed against the string just behind the appropriate fret. Allowing the left shoulder to relax lets the highest finger in the chord or scale slide against and rest on the fret, giving the best sound—and the easiest reach with other fingers. The fingers are, thereby, placed closest to the frets.

Often the index finger is required to play more than one string, called the "barre" technique. The guitarist places the index finger across some or all of the strings at a particular fret and uses the remaining three fingers to play other notes. Rather putting down the barre first, it is often easier to place the fingers and add the barre last, according to which notes are needed first.

When playing notes above the twelfth fret, called "on the body", the left shoulder is dropped and the thumb stays behind, on the neck (as opposed to cello technique where the thumb can be placed on top of the fingerboard to assist in stopping the string).

It is possible to play the same note on different strings, called "registration" or "registering". For example, the note "e", first string open, may be played, or "registered" on any string.

The guitarist often has choices of where to 'register' notes on the guitar based on:
 Ease of fingering. Beginners learn the open, first position before anything else and might be more comfortable registering notes on open strings in the first position. Advanced players might find solutions in higher positions based on musical expression or using a shift on a string as a guide.
 Playing "on the string"—Keeping a melody or musical line on one string for continuity of tone or expression.
 The advent of nylon strings. Historically, the early guitar (pre-WW II) was strung with catgut rather than the nylon to which we have become accustomed. Earlier editions often kept the melody on the second string, which was considered to have a warm full romantic sound in the higher positions that was appropriate to the style of the times. The first string has a thinner diameter, (which tends to emphasize higher harmonic frequencies) and the difficulty of manufacturing affordable strings in suitable quality raised issues of poor intonation. With the advent of nylon strings and refinements in string manufacture, position-playing (playing in a block-style) became more technically feasible as problems with intonation and tone quality were addressed. The introduction of alternative materials to nylon in the manufacture of strings and innovations in modern guitar design continue to bring this issue into focus.
 For reasons of counterpoint: allowing a voice on one string to vibrate for its duration while playing a moving voice on another string.

Slurs

Slurs, trills and other ornaments are often played entirely with the left hand. For example; in a simple case of an ascending semitone slur (Hammer-on), a note stopped by the first finger of the left hand at the fifth fret is first played in normal manner, then, without the right hand doing anything further, the second finger of the left-hand is placed straight down at the sixth fret on the same string, using its momentum to raise the tone of the still-ringing string by a semitone. A descending slur (Pull-off) is simply the opposite of the above, the slur begins on the higher note, and it is common that the finger pressing the higher note actively plucks the string as it lifts, causing the string to vibrate from the fret that the lower finger is depressing. The lower finger is usually in position and pressing before the procedure begins. Three specific descending slurs exist, (1) the active finger lifts directly up and off the string, (2) the active finger rests against the adjacent string immediately after, and (3) a hybrid of these two in which the finger bumps the adjacent string before lifting off.

If these procedures are repeated a few times the result is known as a trill. Because the note is being plucked repeatedly it is possible to continue a trill indefinitely. Occasionally, the upper note in such a trill is played by alternating fingers thus: 2-1-3-1-, etc.

Vibrato

The classical guitar vibrato is executed by rocking the tip of the left-hand finger(s) back and forth horizontally within the same fret space (i.e. along the string axis, and not across it as for a vertical "bend" in rock or blues music) producing a subtle variation in pitch, both sharper and flatter than the starting note, without noticeably altering the fundamental tonal focus of the note being played. The speed of the vibrato often has a great effect on the way the note is perceived, with faster vibratos commonly adding tension and stress, while slower vibratos produce a more lyrical sound. The slowest of vibratos can be used to imitate a bowed instrument "growing" a note after its initial inception. Even though this effect refers to volume in bowed instruments, having a pitch variation that follows the same structure of the volume variation in many situations can have the same effect for the listeners.
When vibrato is required at the first or second fret it is sometimes beneficial to push the string across its axis as it produces a more noticeable vibrato sound there. This second method will only vary the pitch by raising it sharper than the starting note, but is the most common method of vibrato used by steel-string and electric guitar players, lacking the precise tonal qualities of nylon strings.

Harmonics

Natural harmonics can be played by touching a left-hand finger upon specific points along an open string without pressing it down, then playing the note with the right hand. The positions of both the left and right hand are important. The left hand must be placed at a nodal point along the string. Nodal points are found at integral divisions of the string length. The simplest example would be when the left-hand finger divides the string in two and is placed at the twelfth fret. The note then played is one octave higher than the open string. If the string is divided in three (left hand finger near the seventh fret) the note played is one octave and one fifth above the open string. The player must be careful not to pluck the string at another node (nearer the bridge) otherwise the harmonic will not sound. This can be easily demonstrated by resting a left-hand finger on the fifth fret and trying to play the note by plucking the string at the twelfth fret with the right hand - no note will be produced. Ideally the right hand should pluck the string at an antinode.

Artificial harmonics are played by stopping the string as usual with the left hand then resting (not pressing) the index finger of the right hand on the string at a nodal position (commonly 5, 7, 9, or 12 frets above the left-hand finger) and plucking the string with the ring finger or thumb of the right hand.

Left-hand position 
In the left hand, each finger is responsible for exactly one fret. For each hand-position of four frets, the left hand is stationary while its fingers move. Consequently, three hand-positions (of frets 1-4, 5-8, and 9-12) cover the 12-fret octave of each string.

In common with other classical stringed instruments, classical guitar playing and notation use formal positions of the left hand. The 'nth position' means that the hand is positioned with the first finger over the nth fret.

Technique Instruction
There are many books published on classical guitar technique. 

Aguado (1843) Nuevo método para guitarra

Azagra Rueda (2006) The healthy guitarist; how to save energy, avoid injury and get more out of your playing

Berg 1997 Mastering guitar technique process and essence

Carcassi (1836) El método completo para guitarra

Cardoso (2006) Science and method in classical guitar technique

Carlevaro (1978) School of guitar; exposition of instrumental theory

Desrosby (2011) Classical guitarists: unlock your potential; introduction to biomechanics and performance psychology

Duncan (1980) The art of classical guitar playing

Fernández (2008) Technique mechanism learning; becoming a guitarist

Giuliani (1813) Studio per la guitarra

Glise (1997) Classical guitar pedagogy; a handbook for teachers

Iznaola (1993) Kitharologus; The path to virtuosity; a technical workout manual for all guitarists

Iznaola (2013) Summa Kitharologica: The physiology of guitar playing

Johanson (2015) The daily grind

Käppel (2016) The bible of classical guitar technique

de Kloe (2007) Cross-string ornamentation technique

Legnani (1849) Metodo per imparare a conoscere la musica e suonare la guitarra

Leisner (2018) Playing with ease; a healthy approach to guitar technique

Mertz (1846) Schule für die Guitare

Molino (1830) Nouvelle Méthode pour la Guitarre

Offermann (2019) Modern guitar technique; integrative movement theory for guitarists

Palmer (2008) The virtuoso guitarist; method for guitar; Vol.1 A new approach to fast scales

Parkening (1972) The Christopher Parkening guitar method; the art and technique of the classical guitar

Provost (1983) Classic Guitar Technique

Pujol, E (1954) Emilio Pujol: Escuela razonada de la guitarra: basada en los principos de la técnica de Tárrega

 Roch (1921) A modern method for the guitar (school of Tárrega) in three volumes

Romero (2012) La guitarra; a comprehensive study of classical guitar technique and guide to performing

Ryan (1991) The natural classical guitar; the principles of effortless playing-\

Sagreras (1973) Lecciones de guitarra Vol.1-6

Shearer (1990) Learning the Classic Guitar

 Sor (1830) Méthode pour la guitarre

Tamayo (2017) Essential principles for the interpretation on the classical guitar

Taylor (1978) Tone production on the classical guitar

Tennant (1995) Pumping nylon, the classical guitarist's technique handbook

Urshalmi (2008) A conscious approach to guitar technique

 Viloteau (2013) In the black box; technique (s) of the classical guitar; how to think guitar

 Yates (2016) Classical guitar technique from foundation to virtuosity; a comprehensive guide

Studies
There are many exercises that can be used to develop right and left-hand technique on the classical guitar.

Leo Brouwer
Etudes Simples - Volumes 1-4
Matteo Carcassi
25 Etudes Opus 60
Mauro Giuliani
Etudes Instructives Faciles Et Agreables, Opus 100
Xviii Lecons Progressives, Opus 51 (18 Progressive Lessons)
Studio Per La Chitarra, Opus 1 (The Study Of The Guitar)
Studi Dilettevoli, Opus 98 (Entertaining Studies)
Esercizio Per La Chitarra, Opus 48 (Training for the Guitar) 24 Studies
Primi Lezioni Progressive, Opus 139 (First Progressive Lessons)
120 Studies for Right Hand Development
Fernando Sor
12 Studies, Opus 6
Douze Etudes, Opus 29
Vingt Quatre Leçons, Opus 31
Vingt Quatre Exercises, Opus 35
Introduction a l' Etude de la Guitare, Opus 60
20 Studies for Guitar, (a compilation by Andrés Segovia)
Heitor Villa-Lobos
Douze Etudes (1929)

See also
Classical guitar pedagogy

Notes

References

External links
Complete method for the guitar by Otto Feder published by Ditson, 1858
The Humane Guitarist Site dedicated to the technique and health of the classical guitarist.
Musicians and Injuries
Brad Conroy's Lesson on Right Hand Arpeggios
Building Blocks of Classical Guitar Technique
CREATIVE GUITAR - Classical Guitar resource website and blog.
Left-Hand Trouble Shooting by Peter Kun Frary, Professor of Music • University of Hawaii, Leeward.
The Classical Guitar Express Free newsletter on practicing Classical Guitar by Tom Prisloe
"Rest Stroke and Free Stroke Revisited" by Ricardo Iznaola, in PDF or HTML
How to play Classical Guitar Advices by Guitarists for Guitarists 

Guitar performance techniques
Spanish classical guitar